Owen Teale (born 20 May 1961) is a Welsh character actor having appeared in many films, including Robin Hood (1991), The Hawk (1993), King Arthur (2004), The Last Legion (2007), Tolkien (2019), and Dream Horse (2020). On television, he has appeared in Doctor Who (1985), David Copperfield (1986), The Thin Blue Line (1995), Ballykissangel (1999), Line of Duty (2012),  Stella (2012–2013), A Discovery of Witches (2018–2022), and The Rig (2023).

Teale is known mostly for his role as Ser Alliser Thorne in the HBO fantasy TV series Game of Thrones (2011–2016).

Early life
Owen Teale was born on 20 May 1961, in North Cornelly, south Wales, son of Roy and Louise Teale. He attended Cynffig Comprehensive School in Kenfig Hill; he was suspended from the school for disciplinary offences, and credits one of the teachers Mr Davis, with awakening his interest in acting. He trained at the Guildford School of Acting.

Career

In 1984, Teale made his television debut in The Mimosa Boys a film about the Falklands War. in 1985, he appeared in the Doctor Who serial Vengeance on Varos as "Maldak".  His film debut was in War Requiem in 1989. He later appeared in Knights of God (1989), Great Expectations (1989), The Fifteen Streets (1989) and Boon (1990) before being cast as Will Scarlet in the 1991 film Robin Hood.

He went on to appear in such series as Dangerfield, Ballykissangel, The Thin Blue Line and the long-running Belonging, and later Spooks and Murphy's Law.

He later appeared as Lophakin in the 1999 adaptation of The Cherry Orchard, opposite Charlotte Rampling as Ranevskaya and Alan Bates as Gayev. He played the infamous Nazi judge Roland Freisler in Conspiracy. He also had parts In Midsomer Murders and Lewis. 

In 2005, he played a lead role in Marian, Again, in which he was the abusive husband of Harrison's eponymous character. He also did voice over narration for "Tales from the Green Valley", one of several farm series he has done for the BBC.

In 2006, he appeared in the Torchwood episode "Countrycide". Also in 2006 he had a role in the HBO UK TV movie Tsunami: The Aftermath. In 2007, he guest-starred in the Doctor Who audio drama The Mind's Eye. In the same year, he starred in The Last Legion alongside Ben Kingsley and Colin Firth, and was shot on location in Morocco, Tunisia and Slovakia.

In 2011, Teale appeared as Ser Alliser Thorne in Game of Thrones, the HBO TV adaptation of George R. R. Martin's novel series A Song of Ice and Fire, replacing at short notice Derek Halligan. He reprised this role in Season 4, Season 5, and Season 6.

In 2012, he played Dai in the comedy-drama series Stella, and Robert Holland, the fictional UK Foreign Secretary, in the drama series Kidnap and Ransom. He also played Chief Constable Osborne in the BBC police drama Line of Duty.
Between 2018 and 2022. he played Peter Knox in A Discovery of Witches, a series based on the book of the same name by Deborah Harkness.

In 2020, he starred opposite Toni Collette and Damian Lewis in the Wales based sports comedy-drama film Dream Horse.

In 2023, Teale starred as lars Hutton, causing problems on the Kinloch Bravo oil rig in The Rig, in a cast that included Iain Glen, Emily Hampshire, Mark Addy, and Martin Compston.

He has also worked as a voiceover artist for television advertisements.

Personal life
In 1986, Teale married actress Dilys Watling, with whom he has a son, Ion. They divorced in the mid-1990s. In 2001, he married actress Sylvestra Le Touzel; they have two daughters, Eliza and Grace. He likes to play golf, and was made an honorary member of the Pyle and Kenfig Golf Club.

Awards
Teale won the 1997 Tony Award for Best Featured Actor in a Play for his performance as Torvald opposite Janet McTeer in Ibsen's A Doll's House.

Filmography

Films

Television

Theatre

References

External links
 
 

1961 births
Living people
Tony Award winners
Welsh male film actors
Welsh male television actors
Alumni of the Guildford School of Acting
Male actors from Swansea
20th-century Welsh male actors
21st-century Welsh male actors